The First Treaty of Buffalo Creek signed on July 8, 1788 Phelps and Gorham purchased title to lands east from the Genesee River in New York to the Preemption Line.

See also 
 Treaty of Canandaigua
 Treaty of Big Tree
 Second Treaty of Buffalo Creek (1838)
 Third Treaty of Buffalo Creek (1842)
 Fourth Treaty of Buffalo Creek (1857)

Notes

References
Laurence M. Hauptman, Conspiracy of Interests: Iroquois Dispossession and the Rise of New York State (2001).

Seneca tribe
Buffalo Creek
History of Buffalo, New York
1788 treaties
Aboriginal title in New York